The Kyūshū Collegiate American Football Association (九州学生アメリカンフットボール連盟) is an American college football league made up of colleges and universities primarily on the island of Kyushu, Japan; one school is located on Okinawa Island.

Overview
The champion of the Kyūshū League competes with the champions of the Tōkai League, the Chushikoku League, and the Hokuriku League for the right to face the Kansai League champion in the Flash Bowl for the West Japan championship.

Member schools

Division 1

Division 2

League A

League B

Division 1 League Champions

Heiwadai Bowl

The champion of the Kyūshū League plays in the Heiwadai Bowl against the champion of the Chushikoku Collegiate American Football Association in the West Japan playoff bracket.

References

External links
  (Japanese) 
 http://www.kcafa.net/ (Japanese)

American football in Japan
American football leagues
College athletics conferences in Japan